Anthony Spencer Harris (August 12, 1900 – July 3, 1982), was an American professional baseball player who appeared in 164 games in Major League Baseball for the Chicago White Sox (1925–26), Washington Senators (1929), and Philadelphia Athletics (1930). Notably, Harris played for all or parts of 26 seasons in minor league baseball (1921–24; 1927–48), appearing in over 3,100 games.

As a big-leaguer, he collected 94 hits, including 15 doubles, three triples and three home runs in two full seasons (as a member of the White Sox) and parts of two others. He hit .249 with 46 runs batted in.

Harris hit .330 in his final season as a 47-year-old outfielder for the Yakima Packers in 1948. He holds the all-time minor league records for at bats (11,377), hits (3,617), runs scored (2,287), and doubles (743), and ranks fourth all-time with 1,769 RBI.

References

External links

1900 births
1982 deaths
Baseball players from Minnesota
Bay City Wolves players
Chicago White Sox players
Hollywood Stars players
Major League Baseball outfielders
Marysville Braves players
Minneapolis Millers (baseball) players
Minor league baseball managers
Philadelphia Athletics players
Portland Beavers players
San Diego Padres (minor league) players
Seattle Rainiers players
Shreveport Gassers players
Shreveport Sports players
Sportspeople from Duluth, Minnesota
Tacoma Tigers players
Washington Senators (1901–1960) players
Yakima Packers players
Yakima Stars players
North Platte Indians players